Paddy Dunne was a Gaelic football player from Park in  County Laois.

He played for many years on the Laois senior football team in the centre half back position and was widely regarded as one of the outstanding players in Ireland of the 1950s.

With his club Park, he was captain as they won two Laois Senior Football Championship titles in 1952 and 1953.

Called up the Laois team in 1949 following outstanding performances for his club Park, Paddy was centre back on the Laois team who were narrowly beaten by Meath in the 1951 Leinster Football Final. He would still be there in his famous no 6 jersey when Laois suffered another agonising defeat in the 1959 Leinster Football Final.

He also played for his province Leinster, winning three consecutive Railway Cup medals in 1952, 1953 and 1954, all on the field of play. Only one other Laois player, Colm Browne, has managed to emulate this feat.

Dunne played for the Rest Of Ireland XV in 1953 and 1954. He retired from all football following the 59 Leinster final due to a recurring back problem.

A lasting tribute to Dunne's greatness in the famous blue & white jersey was his selection at centre half back on the Laois team of the millennium which was selected a few years back.

In 2008 Dunne was selected to be inducted into the Laois GAA Hall of Fame.

References

External links
 Interview with Paddy Dunne

1929 births
2013 deaths
Laois inter-county Gaelic footballers
Park/Ratheniska Gaelic footballers